The St. Nicholas Church in Pilot Point, Alaska, in Lake and Peninsula Borough, is a Russian Orthodox church whose historic building was listed on the U.S. National Register of Historic Places in 1980. Now it is under Diocese of Alaska of the Orthodox Church in America

The listing included one contributing building (the church) and one contributing object (a bell).  The church, according to one source, was built in 1886; according to another it was built in 1912.  It is "a modest rectangular building",  in dimension.

It was listed on the National Register of Historic Places in 1980.

References 

Buildings and structures in Lake and Peninsula Borough, Alaska
Churches on the National Register of Historic Places in Alaska
Russian Orthodox church buildings in Alaska
Buildings and structures on the National Register of Historic Places in Lake and Peninsula Borough, Alaska